Who Done It? is a 1942 American comedy-mystery film directed by Erle C. Kenton and starring Bud Abbott and Lou Costello. It is noteworthy as their first feature that contains no musical numbers.

Plot
Chick Larkin and Mervyn Milgrim both work at the soda counter of a local radio station's headquarters. Their true passion, however, is to become writers on a radio mystery show. They attend a broadcast of the radio program Murder at Midnight along with one of the writers, Jimmy Turner, and the producer, Jane Little.

As the show begins, the network president, Colonel J.R. Andrews, is mysteriously electrocuted. Seeing this as an opportunity to become radio writers, Chick and Mervyn impersonate detectives and attempt to solve the crime with the help of Juliette Collins, who works for the station. Meanwhile, Moran and Branningan, two real detectives, consider the 'fake' detectives to be prime suspects. A prolonged chase ensues throughout the studio, and the body of Dr. Marek, Andrews' personal physician, is also discovered.

Larkin and Milgrim flee the studio, but hear on the radio that Milgrim has apparently won $10,000 on the Wheel of Fortune radio program. Larkin and Milgrim return to claim the prize, only to be arrested by the real detectives. Turner and Little, who have also been investigating, manage to convince everyone that there should be a full reenactment of the program that led to the murders, so that the true culprit might crack and be revealed.

An eavesdropping Nazi spy, who used the radio station to transmit information to his cohorts, attends the reenactment broadcast. It turns out that the spy murdered the Colonel and his physician because they found out about his illegal radio transmissions.  During the broadcast, he loses his nerve and flees to the roof, where he is pursued by Larkin and Milgrim. After a struggle, Milgrim uses a slingshot to break the light bulbs that spell out the name "TOWNSEND PHELPS", causing the sign to now read "SEND HELP". The police arrive and the murderer is arrested.

Cast

 Bud Abbott as Chick Larkin / Voice of Himself on Radio
 Lou Costello as Mervin Q. Milgrim / Voice of Himself on Radio
 Patric Knowles as Jimmy Turner
 William Gargan as Police Lt. Lou Moran
 Louise Allbritton as Jane Little
 Thomas Gomez as Col. J.R. Andrews
 William Bendix as Detective Brannigan
 Don Porter as Art Fraser
 Jerome Cowan as Marco Heller
 Mary Wickes as Juliet Collins
 Ludwig Stössel as Dr. Anton Marek

Who's on first?
There are two references to the team's popular Who's on First? routine.  During the murder scene, Abbott confuses Costello with the "volts-and-watts" routine. Lou bleats, "Next you'll be telling me Watt's on second base!"  Later, in the radio giveaway program scene, Bud and Lou tune the radio to a broadcast of their own Who's on First? routine, which they promptly turn off and, as an obvious inside joke, disparage.

Release
After completion of this film, Abbott and Costello began a tour of the United States to help promote the selling of U.S. War Bonds.

Who Done It? was re-released in 1949 with Keep 'Em Flying, and in 1954 with Ride 'Em Cowboy.

Home media
This film has been released three times on VHS 1989, 1991 and 2000.  It has also been released twice on DVD. The first time, on The Best of Abbott and Costello Volume One, on February 10, 2004, and again on October 28, 2008 as part of Abbott and Costello: The Complete Universal Pictures Collection.

References

External links

1942 films
1942 comedy films
1940s comedy mystery films
1940s spy comedy films
Abbott and Costello films
American black-and-white films
American comedy mystery films
American comedy thriller films
American spy comedy films
American thriller films
1940s English-language films
Films about radio people
Films directed by Erle C. Kenton
Films scored by Frank Skinner
Universal Pictures films
1940s American films